Anticappella were an Italian music group led by Gianfranco Bortolotti, the founder of Cappella. Their best-known hits were "2 √ 231" ("2 Square Root 231") and "Move Your Body", featuring rapper MC Fixx It.

Discography

Studio albums

Singles

References

Italian electronic music groups
Italian Eurodance groups